John Edward Timms (3 November 1906 – 18 March 1980) was an English first-class cricketer who played for Northamptonshire. He was a right-handed middle order batsman and a part time right arm medium pace bowler.

Timms made his first-class debut in 1925, aged 18 and scored his maiden century the following season. He passed 1,000 runs in a season on 11 occasions during his career with a best of 1629 runs in 1934 which he made at an average of 34.65. That year he also made his highest score for Northamptonshire, 213 against Worcestershire	at Stourbridge.

References

External links
Cricinfo profile

1906 births
1980 deaths
English cricketers
Northamptonshire cricketers
North v South cricketers